Club Sporting Cristal S.A. is a Peruvian sports club located in the city of Lima, best known for its football team. It was founded on 13 December 1955 in the Rímac district by engineer Richard Bentín Mujica and his wife Esther Grande de Bentín, stockholders of the Peruvian brewery Backus and Johnston. The club and the brewery have been closely linked since its inception, and it is for this reason that it is popularly known as los Cerveceros ("the brewers").

The team has played in the Primera División since 1956, where it obtained the title that year. Due to this achievement, Cristal is often referred to as "El club que nació campeón". Since their first participation, they have won the league title 19 times and are one of the few teams in Peru to have never been relegated from the top division. Sporting Cristal is also the first Peruvian team to have been crowned tricampeóns, successively winning the 1994, 1995, and 1996 seasons. In 1997, they were runners-up of the Copa Libertadores, losing the final to Brazilian side Cruzeiro. Cristal holds the longest undefeated streak in the tournament; 17 games without suffering a loss.

Cristal has a heated rivalry with Club Universitario de Deportes. One of the main reasons for the enmity between the two sides is the series of transfers of Universitario's star players to los Celestes. The club also has rivalries with Alianza Lima, Deportivo Municipal, and Sport Boys.

Sporting Cristal plays its home games at the Estadio Alberto Gallardo. They play at the Estadio Nacional for international competitions such as the Libertadores or Sudamericana. The Estadio Nacional is also the venue for matches against Universitario and Alianza Lima.

In addition to football, the club has teams specializing in futsal, women's football (3 Peruvian Primera División Femenina titles), and volleyball.

History
Ricardo Bentín Mujica, with the support of his wife, co-owners of Backus and Johnston brewery, was the man who is credited with achieving the company's goal. A club from Rímac ward, known as Sporting Tabaco founded in 1926 and originally belonging to the tobacco growers' union, was already playing in the professional Peruvian First Division.  Never having won a national championship, the club was in dire economic straits.  Bentín decided to buy the club and search for a playing ground, so that the club could develop and be able to play better at the professional level. The club found a lot in the neighborhood of La Florida of 137,000 m².

On December 13, 1955 the club was founded as Sporting Cristal , after Backus' best-known beer brand, Cristal. The new club from the Rímac ward debuted in 1956 in the professional Primera Division and won their first national title that same year. Journalists thus called them the club born a champion (nació campeon). The team managed to win more titles over the years and was known as one of the best football clubs in Peru after Universitario and Alianza Lima. A few years later, the club eliminated the word Backus from their name to demonstrate their economic independence.

During the 1962 edition until the 1969 edition of the Copa Libertadores, Sporting Cristal went on a 17-game undefeated streak, the longest unbeaten streak in the Copa Libertadores, winning 8 games, and tying 9.

Sporting Cristal changed its shirt color from blue to light blue. They are known as "Los Celestes". During a brief period between 1978 and 1981, they again used blue shirts. In 1982 they returned to light blue as the color of the club.

The 1990s were the most successful decade as they claimed 4 national titles (including 3 in a row) with coach Juan Carlos Oblitas. Under Oblitas, Cristal won 1991, 1994 and 1995 domestic league. Then, guided by Sergio Markarián head coach they won 1996 league. By 1997, the team, led by Uruguayan coach Sergio Markarián, reached the finals of the Copa Libertadores, where they faced the Brazilian club Cruzeiro. The first leg was a home game, in which they ended in a scoreless draw; in the second leg, they lost 1–0. This is the closest Team Peru has come to the Copa Libertadores Final since 1972, when Universitario had a similar fate playing against Independiente.

The club stayed on the top spots of the national tournament during most of the 2000s and gained qualification to the Copa Libertadores eight years in a row from 2000 to 2007. It would only win two titles during the decade which were obtain in 2002 and 2005 with many notable players as Sergio Leal, Jorge Soto and Luis Alberto Bonnet. However, during the 2007, Cristal would come four points away from relegation. It would make a comeback during the 2008 season and qualify to the Copa Libertadores once again.

In 2009, the Primera División Peruana would change the tournament structured which caused Sporting Cristal to have mediocre results for the next few years into the new decade. After a seven-year dry spell it would become the national champion once more during the 2012 season when it defeated Real Garcilaso in the finals. They qualified to the 2013 Copa Libertadores where they did not pass the tournament's group stage. In the 2013 season, they played on the same liguilla as Real Garcilaso and fought for a place in the final up to the last match of the season in which they finished third and qualified for the 2014 Copa Libertadores once more.

In the 2018 season, they conquered another historical feat, they became the best Team Peru in the Historic Table during the Professional Era (1966 - 2018). As of 2018, they surpassed Universitario for the first spot, 3264 points to Universitario's 3236 points.

In the 2020 season, Roberto Mosquera returned as coach after 7 years.

Rivalries
Sporting Cristal has had longstanding rivalries with Universitario, Alianza Lima, Deportivo Municipal, and Sport Boys.

Supporters
Cristal has three ultras or barra bravas known as Extremo Celeste, Fverza Oriente Gvardia Xtrema.
Fverza Oriente was the first ultra of Cristal, founded in 1975. They are located on eastern grandstand of the stadiums. Extremo Celeste was formed in 1991 when a group of young fans from Fuerza Oriente decided to form a new group for young energetic supporters. Extremo Celeste has become one of the biggest barras bravas in Peru. And in 2007 a smaller third ultra was created in the western grandstand to support the team. Sporting Cristal had supporters on every grandstand on Estadio Alberto Gallardo.

Honours

National

League
Peruvian Primera División: 
Winners (20): 1956, 1961, 1968, 1970, 1972, 1979, 1980, 1983, 1988, 1991, 1994, 1995, 1996, 2002, 2005, 2012, 2014, 2016, 2018, 2020
Runner-up (14): 1962, 1963, 1967, 1973, 1977, 1989, 1992, 1997, 1998, 2000, 2003, 2004, 2015, 2021

Torneo Apertura/Fase 1:
Winners (4): 2003, 2015, 2018, 2021
Runner-up (6): 1997, 2001, 2006, 2008, 2016, 2019

Torneo Clausura/Fase 2:
Winners (6): 1998, 2002, 2004, 2005, 2014, 2016
Runner-up (5): 2000, 2008, 2020, 2021, 2022

Torneo de Verano: 
Winners (1): 2018

Torneo Regional: 
Winners (3): 1989-I, 1991-I, 1991-II

Torneo Interzonal: 
Winners (1): 1982

National Cup
Copa Bicentenario: 
Winners (1): 2021

International
Copa Libertadores: 
Runner-up (1): 1997

Friendly International
Copa El Gráfico-Perú: 
Winners (2): 2001, 2006
Runner-up (1): 2002-II

Copa Marlboro: 
Winners (1): 1988

Under-20 team
Torneo de Promoción y Reserva: 
Winners (3): 2016, 2018, 2019
Runner-up (3): 2014-I, 2015-III, 2017

Copa Modelo Centenario: 
Winners (1): 2016

Copa Generación: 
Winners (1): 2021

Performance in CONMEBOL competitions
Copa Libertadores: 34 appearances
Runners-up (1): 1997
1962, 1968, 1969, 1971, 1973, 1974, 1978, 1980, 1981, 1984, 1989, 1990, 1992, 1993, 1995, 1996, 1997, 1998, 1999, 2000, 2001, 2002, 2003, 2004, 2005, 2006, 2007, 2009, 2013, 2014, 2015, 2016, 2017, 2019

Copa Sudamericana: 2 appearances
2018:  First Stage
2019:  Round of 16
Copa CONMEBOL: 1 appearance
1994: Quarter-finals

Copa Merconorte: 4 appearances
1998: First Round
1999: First Round
2000: First Round
2001: First Round

U-20 Copa Libertadores: 1 appearance
2012: Group Stage

Women's volleyball
Liga Nacional Superior de Voleibol: 
Runner-up (1): 2013–14

Players

Current squad
.

Out on loan

Presidential history

Records

Year-by-year 

This is a partial list of the last five seasons completed by Sporting Cristal. For the full season-by-season history, see List of Sporting Cristal seasons.

Managerial history 

List of Sporting Cristal managers through club history.

Notes

References

External links
Sporting Cristal Official Club Website

 
Football clubs in Lima
Association football clubs established in 1955
1955 establishments in Peru